Omaima Sohail (born 11 July 1997) is a Pakistani cricketer who plays as a right-arm off break bowler and right-handed batter. She currently plays for Pakistan, and has played domestic cricket for Balochistan, Khyber Pakhtunkhwa, Karachi, Omar Associates, Zarai Taraqiati Bank Limited and State Bank of Pakistan. 

In September 2018, she was named in the Pakistan's squad for their series against Bangladesh. She made her Women's One Day International (WODI) debut for Pakistan against Bangladesh on 8 October 2018. Prior to her full international debut, she was named in Pakistan's squad for the 2018 Women's Twenty20 Asia Cup, but did not play.

In October 2018, she was named in Pakistan's squad for the 2018 ICC Women's World Twenty20 tournament in the West Indies. Later the same month, she made her Women's Twenty20 International (WT20I) debut for Pakistan Women against Australia on 25 October 2018. In January 2020, she was named in Pakistan's squad for the 2020 ICC Women's T20 World Cup in Australia. In October 2021, she was named in Pakistan's team for the 2021 Women's Cricket World Cup Qualifier tournament in Zimbabwe. In January 2022, she was named in Pakistan's team for the 2022 Women's Cricket World Cup in New Zealand. In May 2022, she was named in Pakistan's team for the cricket tournament at the 2022 Commonwealth Games in Birmingham, England.

References

External links
 
 

1997 births
Living people
Cricketers from Karachi
Pakistani women cricketers
Pakistan women One Day International cricketers
Pakistan women Twenty20 International cricketers
Baluchistan women cricketers
Khyber Pakhtunkhwa women cricketers
Karachi women cricketers
Omar Associates women cricketers
Zarai Taraqiati Bank Limited women cricketers
State Bank of Pakistan women cricketers
Cricketers at the 2022 Commonwealth Games
Commonwealth Games competitors for Pakistan